Bárbara Lennie Holguín (born 20 April 1984) is a Spanish actress, hailed as an indie cinema star. She won the Goya Award for Best Actress for her performance in the 2014 neo-noir drama Magical Girl, also scooping nominations for Obaba (New Actress), El niño (Supporting Actress), María (and Everybody Else) (Best Actress), and God's Crooked Lines (Best Actress).

Biography 
Born in Madrid on 20 April 1984, she is of Argentinian and Irish descent. She moved as a toddler with her family from the Prosperidad neighborhood to Buenos Aires, where she lived for 6 years before returning to Madrid circa 1990. She graduated from the Real Escuela Superior de Arte Dramático (RESAD), after which she started working professionally as an actress. Her credits include Magical Girl, Obaba and El Niño and the television series Isabel and El incidente.

She gave birth to her first child, a daughter, with her partner Diego Postigo in 2022.

Filmography

Film

Television

Accolades

References

External links 
 

1984 births
Living people
Actresses from Madrid
Spanish film actresses
Spanish television actresses
21st-century Spanish actresses
Spanish stage actresses
Spanish people of Argentine descent
Spanish people of Irish descent